Tables is a collaborative database program developed out of Google's Area 120 incubator. Tables is available as a web application. The app allows users to collaborate in real-time to track work more efficiently using automation.

History 
Tables originated as an experiment within Google's Area 120 product incubator, and launched to a public beta in the United States on September 22, 2020. It was first released as a test for a limited number of early testers on March 5, 2020, and then expanded to a larger early access program on May 5, 2020. Tables is not part of the Google Drive or Google Workspace service.

In June of 2021, it was announced that the Area 120 experiment was a success and that Google Cloud "has committed to investing in this product area long-term".

Platforms 
Tables is available as a web application supported on the Google Chrome, Microsoft Edge, Apple Safari, and Mozilla Firefox web browsers.

Key Features

Core concepts 
Tables anchors around several core concepts:

 Tables: containers of rows and columns of structured data. Columns (aka "fields") define the table structure and enforce data type/format and relationships.
 Workspaces: allow users to group tables together in a tabbed interface. Tables can be in more than one workspace.
 Views: allow users to create customized views of the data with different layouts, groupings, and filters/sorts applied. Layouts allow you to switch between different ways to visualize the table records, such as a ticket queue, kanban board, or map.
 Forms: allow users to collect input without giving access to the table. Tables forms are separate from Google Forms.
 Bots: allow users to automate tasks, such as send emails, update data, or send weekly reports, and send data to 3rd party webhooks to trigger Google Chat or Slack notifications or Zapier workflows.

Data types 
Tables allow users to set specific data types for columns:

Integrations 
 Tables allows users to import data directly from a Google Sheet or CSV file, and also performs a one-way recurring sync of data from a table into Google Sheets.
 Person-type columns in Tables allow the user to search for and select Google users from your Gmail contacts.
 Sharing in Tables allows the user to share with existing Google users, Google Groups, or with their entire work domain.
 Tables also offers a public API and the ability to call the Tables API via Apps Script.

Collaboration and revision history 
Tables allows users to collaborate in real-time on records in a table. Tables can be shared, opened, and edited by multiple users simultaneously and users are able to see field-by-field changes as collaborators make edits. All changes to table records are automatically saved to Google's servers, and a change history for records are automatically kept so past edits may be viewed and reverted to. Deleted rows, columns, tables, and workspaces can also be restored within a given timeframe.

Sharing and access control 
Users can share their tables and workspaces from Tables using similar permissioning roles as Google Drive, such as editors, commenters, and viewers. Tables also supports an additional "writer" role that allows users to modify rows in the table, but not the table or columns.

Users can share tables and workspaces with other individual Google users, Google Groups, or with their entire work domain.

Tables and workspaces can be shared independently of each other, and you can restrict access to a table within a workspace to provide more granular control of which users can see which data.

References

External links 

 
 Official help center

Collaborative software
Google software